General Sir William Pollexfen Radcliffe  (22 December 1822 – 23 March 1897) was a British Army officer who became General Officer Commanding Eastern District.

Military career
Radcliffe was commissioned as an ensign in the 20th Regiment of Foot on 12 March 1841. After serving in Bermuda and Canada, he fought at the Battle of Alma in September 1854, the Battle of Balaclava in October 1854 and the Battle of Inkerman in November 1854 as well as the Siege of Sevastopol during the Crimean War. He went on to be Inspector-General of Musketry of Hythe in January 1873 and General Officer Commanding Eastern District in October 1878. He was promoted full general on 1 April 1887.

He was also Colonel of the Royal Berkshire Regiment from 1891 to 1894, when he transferred to be Colonel of the Lancashire Fusiliers until his death.

References

British Army generals
1822 births
1897 deaths
Knights Commander of the Order of the Bath
Lancashire Fusiliers officers
Military personnel from Devon